The 2022 United States Senate election in Arkansas was held on November 8, 2022, to elect a member to the United States Senate to represent the state of Arkansas. Incumbent Republican Senator John Boozman was first elected in 2010, defeating Democratic incumbent Blanche Lincoln. Boozman was re-elected for a second term in the 2016 with 59.8% of the vote and ran in 2022 for a third term. Primary elections in Arkansas were held on May 24. Boozman won the Republican primary with 58% of the vote, and he defeated Democrat Natalie James in the general election.

Republican primary

Incumbent Senator John Boozman ran with the endorsement of former President Donald Trump. However, he attracted multiple opponents from the right who questioned his loyalty to Trump, attacking him for refusing to object to the results of the 2020 United States Presidential election. Despite it being his first time running for office, former NFL football player Jake Bequette and his supporting groups raised over $2.6 million dollars. Boozman ultimately won with 58% of the vote, easily avoiding a runoff.

Candidates

Nominee
 John Boozman, incumbent U.S. Senator

Eliminated in primary
 Jake Bequette, former NFL player and U.S. Army veteran
Heath Loftis, pastor
 Jan Morgan, gun range owner and candidate for Governor of Arkansas in 2018

Withdrew
 Michael Deel, corporate analyst

Endorsements

Polling

Results

Democratic primary

Candidates

Nominee
Natalie James, small business owner and community advocate

Eliminated in primary
Jack Foster, former Pine Bluff city alderman
Dan Whitfield, activist and Independent candidate for U.S. Senate in 2020

Polling

Results

Libertarian convention

Candidates

Nominated at convention
Kenneth Cates

General election

Predictions

Endorsements

Polling

Results

By congressional district
Boozman won all 4 congressional districts.

See also
 2022 United States Senate elections
 2022 United States House of Representatives elections in Arkansas
 2022 Arkansas gubernatorial election
 2022 Arkansas elections

Notes

References

External links 
Official campaign websites
 John Boozman (R) for Senate
 Kenneth Cates (L) for Senate
 Natalie James (D) for Senate

2022
Arkansas
United States Senate